38 Special (also stylized as .38 Special or spelled out as Thirty-Eight Special) is an American rock band that was formed by Donnie Van Zant and Don Barnes in 1974 in Jacksonville, Florida.

They are best known for their early 1980s hit singles "Hold On Loosely" and "Caught Up in You", along with other Top 40 hits on the Billboard Hot 100 in the 1980s and early 1990s, including Rockin' into the Night, "You Keep Runnin' Away", "If I'd Been the One", "Back Where You Belong", "Teacher, Teacher", "Like No Other Night", "Second Chance", and "The Sound of Your Voice".

History

1970s 
Donnie Van Zant, the younger brother of Lynyrd Skynyrd founder Ronnie Van Zant, began playing music himself during his teen years, forming the band Standard Production in 1968, which paved the way for Sweet Rooster, Donnie's first professional outfit that he formed in 1969 with guitarist Jeff Carlisi and bassist Ken Lyons, soon joined by drummer Steve Brookins. Carlisi left Sweet Rooster after graduating high school to study architecture at Georgia Tech and was replaced by Don Barnes in 1970. Brookins also left to work as a truck driver and Sweet Rooster was defunct by 1973.

Nevertheless, Van Zant, Barnes and Lyons, while continuing their day jobs and working in other bands, began working on composing original songs in their spare time. By 1974, they decided it was time to get serious and form "the ultimate band" that would be their "one last shot" at success. Briefly, Van Zant was considering a higher-paying position for the railroad at which he worked, but was finally convinced by brother Ronnie to stick with music since it was "in his blood".

The new outfit comprised Van Zant, Barnes, Lyons, Brookins, second drummer Jack Grondin and a returning Carlisi. The band's name was thought up after an incident which found the boys practicing in a warehouse out in the middle of nowhere. When police arrived after being notified by locals of the noise, the band members were unable to come out because of a padlock on the door. One of the cops said, "That's all right. We'll let this .38 special do the talking", and shot off the lock.

Now that they had their name, the group spent most of 1975 and 1976 playing a steady grind of one-nighters, mostly in the South and the Midwest. Eventually, big brother Ronnie figured Donnie and the gang had paid enough dues and set them up with Skynryd's manager Peter Rudge, who also handled the Who and was tour manager for the Rolling Stones. Rudge quickly set the group up to open shows for red-hot acts, like Peter Frampton, Foghat and Kiss, and got them signed to A&M Records, who assigned Dan Hartman (of Edgar Winter Group fame) to produce their first album, .38 Special, which was released in May 1977.

Just before the record's release, bassist Ken Lyons decided to leave the band. He was replaced by their friend and original Lynyrd Skynyrd member Larry Junstrom.

Also in 1977, the band added two female backup singers, Carol Bristow and Dale Krantz. Krantz was replaced by Nancy Henderson (1979–1981), Lu Moss (1981–1984) and Lynn Hineman (1986–1987) before backup singers were dispensed with in 1987.

In October 1977 Ronnie Van Zant was killed when Skynyrd's plane crashed. Donnie wrote "Take Me Back" as a tribute to his brother, which appeared on the band's second album, Special Delivery (March 1978), also produced by Hartman.

1980–1999 
The band's first two albums had a strong Southern rock influence. By the early 1980s, .38 Special had shifted to a more accessible guitar-driven arena rock style without completely abandoning its Southern rock roots. This shift helped to usher in a string of successful albums and singles. Engineer Rodney Mills, who had worked with Atlanta Rhythm Section and others, assumed the producer's reins from here on and Survivor co-founder Jim Peterik became a frequent songwriting collaborator of the band's from 1979 on, which helped account for this change in sound and subsequent success.

"Rockin' into the Night", the title track from the group's third album (released in October 1979), which Peterik and his bandmates had originally written for Survivor, found its way to 38 Special's manager, Mark Spector, and was given to the band. Sung by 38's guitarist Don Barnes (who would sing lead vocals on all of the band's hits through 1987), the tune became their first song to receive national airplay, peaking at No. 43 on the Billboard Hot 100 in early 1980.

This paved the way for their platinum-selling fourth record, Wild-Eyed Southern Boys (January 1981), and its bigger hit "Hold On Loosely" (which reached No. 27 in 1981).

Their next release, Special Forces (May 1982), contained the Top 10 hit "Caught Up in You" (just like "Hold On Loosely", composed by Barnes and Carlisi with Peterik) which hit No. 1 on the Billboard Rock Tracks chart, as did the single, "If I'd Been the One" (October 1983), from their November 1983 release Tour de Force. "You Keep Runnin' Away" (August 1982) and "Back Where You Belong" (February 1984) continued the sequence of hit radio favorites.

In the fall of 1984, they had another hit with "Teacher, Teacher", from the soundtrack of the 1984 film Teachers, written by Jim Vallance and Bryan Adams. The song climbed to No. 4 on the Billboard Top Tracks Chart, spending ten weeks on the chart.

In 1984 38 Special toured with the up-and-coming Huey Lewis and the News, who were just breaking huge with their Sports album, and in 1986 they shared the bill with the soon-to-be-platinum-selling hard rock band, Bon Jovi.

By 1987, Don Barnes had decided to leave the band to go out on his own. He recorded an album called Ride the Storm, which, though slated for release in 1989, was shelved after A&M Records was sold and did not see the light of day until 2017 – some 28 years later.

In the meantime, the group moved on, bringing in guitarist Danny Chauncey, after drummer Steve Brookins also decided to leave, and singer/keyboardist Max Carl, from West Coast rhythm and blues unit Jack Mack & the Heart Attack.

The next release, Rock & Roll Strategy (June 1988), saw the group playing down their heavy guitar sound and putting forth a more 1980s pop keyboard-oriented approach, led by Carl's more R&B-style voice. "Second Chance" (taken from Rock & Roll Strategy) was a No. 1 hit on Billboards adult contemporary chart in early 1989.

Carl was also lead singer on "The Sound of Your Voice" (Billboard Hot 100 No. 33 in 1991) from Bone Against Steel (July 1991), which saw the group moving from A&M to the British label Charisma Records. That same year, Bobby Capps came aboard as keyboardist/co-singer and drummer Scott Meeder replaced Jack Grondin after the latter decided to leave the music business. But the band found themselves without a home after Charisma folded in 1992.

After touring with the band through the spring of 1992, Max Carl decided to depart, making way for the return of Don Barnes. Since that time, the band has mostly concentrated on touring, with an occasional release of new material. Scott Hoffman took over the drum chair from Meeder later in 1992. Donny Baldwin (ex-Jefferson Starship) filled in for Hoffman on some 1996 tour dates after Hoffman was down with a broken arm, but Gary "Madman" Moffatt (formerly of Cactus) has been the band's drummer since 1997.

Through the small Razor & Tie label, 38 Special released "Fade to Blue" from the album Resolution (June 1997). The single hit No. 33 on the Mainstream Rock chart in 1997.

Since 1997's Resolution, two more releases have followed on the CMC International and Sanctuary Records labels, respectively A Wild-Eyed Christmas Night (September 2001) and Drivetrain (July 2004).

 2000s–present 
In 2007, .38 Special was the opening act on Lynyrd Skynyrd and Hank Williams Jr.'s Rowdy Frynds Tour. Also, on September 27, 2008, they filmed a CMT Crossroads special with country singer Trace Adkins, performing both artists' hits from over the years.

In 2009, .38 Special opened for REO Speedwagon and Styx as part of the "Can't Stop Rockin' Tour".

Van Zant missed a handful of shows in 2011, and in 2012 a notice was posted on 38 Special's website saying Donnie Van Zant would not tour with the band due to health issues related to inner-ear nerve damage, although he would continue to write and record with the band. But in 2013, after nearly a year of missing performances, it was confirmed that Van Zant had officially left 38 Special after 39 years and was retiring from music.

In 2012 original bassist Ken Lyons died at age 59.

In 2014 longtime bassist Larry Junstrom was replaced by Barry Dunaway (a veteran of many classic rock outfits, including Pat Travers Band, Yngwie Malmsteen and Survivor). Dunaway had previously filled in for Junstrom for a handful of shows in 2011 and a few shows in 2013 as well. Junstrom was then forced to retire due to a hand injury that required surgery.

Since 2019, the band's lineup has consisted of Don Barnes, keyboardist/vocalist Bobby Capps, drummer Gary Moffatt, Dunaway, and guitarist Jerry Riggs. This leaves Don Barnes as the only original member, although Barnes was absent from the band from 1987 until 1992.

Larry Junstrom died on October 6, 2019, at age 70.

 Band members 
 Musicians Current members Don Barnes – lead and backing vocals, lead and rhythm guitar, harmonica, mandolin, keyboards (1974–1987, 1992–present)
 Bobby Capps – keyboards, backing vocals (touring member 1987–1992; 1992–present)
 Gary "Madman" Moffatt – drums, percussion (1996–present)
 Barry Dunaway – bass, backing vocals (2014–present; touring substitute 2011, 2013)
 Jerry Riggs – lead guitar, backing vocals (2019–present)Touring musicians Carol Bristow – backing vocals (1977–1987)
 Dale Krantz Rossington – backing vocals (1977–1979)
 Nancy Henderson – backing vocals (1979–1980)
 Lu Moss – backing vocals (1981–1984)
 Lynn Hineman – backing vocals (1986–1987)Touring substitutes Donny Baldwin – drums, percussion (1996; filled in for Scott Hoffman)
 Paul Drennan (Drennen) – bass, backing vocals (2022; filled in for Barry Dunaway)Former members'''
 Donnie Van Zant – lead and backing vocals, guitar (1974–2013)
 Jeff Carlisi – lead guitar (1974–1997)
 Jack Grondin – drums, percussion (1974–1991)
 Steve Brookins – drums, percussion (1974–1987)
 Ken Lyons – bass (1974–1977; died 2012)
 Larry Junstrom – bass, occasional guitar (1977–2014; died 2019)
 Steve McRay – keyboards, harmonica, backing vocals (1986–1987)
 Max Carl – lead vocals, keyboards (1987–1992)
 Danny Chauncey – lead guitar, backing vocals, keyboards (1987–2019)
 Scott Meeder – drums, percussion (1991–1992)
 Scott Hoffman – drums, percussion (1992–1997)

 Lineups 

 Timeline 

 Discography 

 Studio albums 
 38 Special (1977)
 Special Delivery (1978)
 Rockin' into the Night (1979)
 Wild-Eyed Southern Boys (1981)
 Special Forces (1982)
 Tour de Force (1983)
 Strength in Numbers (1986)
 Rock & Roll Strategy (1988)
 Bone Against Steel (1991)
 Resolution (1997)
 A Wild-Eyed Christmas Night (2001)
 Drivetrain'' (2004)

References

External links 

38 Special live photo gallery

A&M Records artists
Southern rock musical groups from Jacksonville
American blues rock musical groups
American country rock groups
Hard rock musical groups from Florida
Musical groups established in 1974
1974 establishments in Florida